A number of monuments and memorials dedicated to the Irish Rebellion of 1798 exist in Ireland and in other countries. Some of the monuments are in remembrance of specific battles or figures, whilst others are general war memorials.

Ireland

Australia

See also
List of monuments and memorials to the Irish Rebellion of 1803
List of monuments and memorials to the Fenian Rebellion

References 

Outdoor sculptures in Ireland
Monuments and memorials in Ireland
Irish Rebellion of 1798
Memorials to the Irish Rebellion of 1798
Lists of war monuments and memorials
Irish Rebellion of 1798